Bousfer Air Base is a military airport located  north of Bousfer, Oran, Algeria.

See also
List of airports in Algeria

References

External links 
 Airport record for Bousfer Air Base at Landings.com
OurAirports - Bou Sfer

Airports in Algeria
Buildings and structures in Oran Province